Hermensen Ballo (born February 26, 1971) is a retired male boxer from Indonesia. He twice represented his native South East Asian country at the Summer Olympics: 1996 and 2000. In 1996 he was stopped in the second round of the men's flyweight division (– 51 kg) by eventual bronze medalist Zoltan Lunka from Germany after defeating Guy-Elie Boulingui of Gabon in his opening contest. In 2000, he lost his first bout to José Navarro of the United States.

References
 

1971 births
Living people
Indonesian Christians
Light-flyweight boxers
Boxers at the 1996 Summer Olympics
Boxers at the 2000 Summer Olympics
Olympic boxers of Indonesia
People from Kupang
Sportspeople from East Nusa Tenggara
Asian Games medalists in boxing
Boxers at the 1994 Asian Games
Boxers at the 1998 Asian Games
Medalists at the 1994 Asian Games
Medalists at the 1998 Asian Games
Indonesian male boxers
Asian Games silver medalists for Indonesia
Asian Games bronze medalists for Indonesia
20th-century Indonesian people